Helen Heffron Roberts (1888–1985) was an American anthropologist and pioneer ethnomusicologist.  Her work included the study of the origins and development of music among the Jamaican Maroons, and the Puebloan peoples of the American southwest. Her recordings of ancient Hawaiian meles are archived at the Bernice P. Bishop Museum in Honolulu.  Roberts was a protege of Alfred V. Kidder and Franz Boas.

Early life and music background
She was born in Chicago on June 12, 1888, the oldest of three children born to accountant William Hinman Roberts and his wife, artist Dana Alma McDonald Roberts.  Her parents provided piano lessons for her at an early age and encouraged her towards a career as a classical pianist. Upon the completion of her basic education at Monticello Seminary, Roberts furthered her studies, graduating from Chicago Musical College in 1909 and the American Conservatory of Music in 1911.

Anthropological studies
While at the conservatory, Roberts began to realize that she did not have the abilities to achieve her parents' dream of becoming a classical pianist. Besides not having the hand dexterity, she suffered from unspecified recurring health issues. In an interview in later years, she cited both her health and an early interest in Native American culture as the motivations for her travels to the southwestern United States. Over the next several years, her continued post graduate work at the conservatory was interspersed with employment as a music teacher in Kansas, Texas and Mexico, where she was often joined by family members.

Her archaeological interests also began during this time period, and she apprenticed under Alfred V. Kidder at his site excavations in Pecos, New Mexico. In 1916, she published "Doubling coiling" (pottery) in American Anthropologist. Berthold Laufer of Chicago's Field Museum of Natural History added his encouragement to that of Kidder who advised her to enroll at Columbia University. Under the tutelage of Franz Boas, known as the father of American anthropology, she changed her life goals from a career as either a music teacher or professional musician, to the study of the origins and progression of music in ethnic cultures. Boas advised her that as pioneer in the relatively new field of ethnomusicology she would have little competition.

By the time she received her 1919 M.A. degree in anthropology, her blended fields of interest were beginning to evidence themselves in her publications. She reviewed H.  E. Krehbiel's book Afro-American Folksongs in 1917 for the Journal of American Folklore; and in 1918 with co-author Herman K. Haeberlin, published Some Songs of the Puget sound Salish in the Journal of American Folklore. During 1919 she did two reviews, Nabaloi Songs by C. R. Moss and A. L. Kroeber for American Anthropologist, and Teton Sioux Music by Frances Densmore for the Journal of American Folklore. Her master's thesis Coiled Basketry in British Columbia and Surrounding Region, written with Haeberlin and James A. Tiet, was published in 1928.

Field work and transcriptions
Under the aegis of the American Association for the Advancement of Science and the Folklore Foundation at Vassar College, Roberts spent several months of 1920–1921 in Jamaica with foundation chair Martha Beckwith. Their collaborative efforts resulted in recordings and published works on Jamaican forklore. Beckwith published Folk-Games of Jamaica with music recorded in the field by Roberts in 1921. The pair also published Jamaica Anansi Stories in 1924. Roberts published Possible Survivals of African Song in Jamaica in 1926, that centers around the history and culture of the Jamaican Maroons.

The field work completed by Roberts in Hawaii during 1923 and 1924 produced the recording of 1,255 individual meles that are currently archived at the Bernice P. Bishop Museum in Honolulu. In 1926, Roberts recorded Ellen Brazill, in the remote northern California community of Somes Bar, singing a "Konomihu Lullaby". This wax cylinder recording can be heard at the American Folklife Center. Specifics of this recording session, part of a project to preserve the dying Shasta language, can be found in the Smithsonian National Anthropological Archive.

Her initial apprenticeship with Alfred V. Kidder served not only to change her career choice, but also provided a path to exploring her ongoing interest in Native American culture. In 1923, she published Chakwena Songs of Zuñi and Laguna in The Journal of American Folklore. She began doing field work among the Puebloan peoples in 1930, and an Alan Lomax 16mm video reel collection of American folk songs includes a Tewa dance that Roberts filmed in 1936 near San Ildefonso Pueblo, New Mexico. Artwork from San Ildefonso Pueblo collected at this time by Roberts can be found in the collection of the National Museum of the American Indian.

In between field assignments, Roberts collaborated with several professionals with whom she would be associated for most of her life. Clark Wissler and Jesse Walter Fewkes involved her with their work on Pawnee music, and it was for Edward Sapir that she transcribed the Diamond Jenness collection of Songs of the Nootka Indians of Western Vancouver Island.  In 1924, she accepted a Yale University staff position at the request of Wissler who was helping spearhead a new project funded by the Rockefeller Foundation. Sapir became her supervisor at Yale in 1931, where she would remain until 1936.

Edwin Grant Burrows, after two years on the staff of Honolulu's Bernice P. Bishop Museum, arrived at Yale in 1933 to work on both his M.A. and Ph.D anthropology degrees, and according to Roberts came under her mentorship. Her professional work and associations for Yale took her to Europe where she formed a lifelong friendship with Beatrice Blackwood.

A 1934 grant from the Carnegie Corporation of New York provided for her procurement of specially designed recording equipment to facilitate her Yale project of copying wax cylinder recordings to aluminum discs.  Additionally, Roberts became a collector of wax cylinders recorded by other researchers in her field. She eventually donated 400 such wax cylinder recordings to the permanent collection of the Archive of Folk Culture at the Library of Congress.

Along with musicologist and composer Charles Seeger, composer Henry Cowell,  ethnomusicologist George Herzog and Dorothy Lawton of the New York Public Library, Roberts was a founding member of the American Society for Comparative Musicology in 1933, the parent organization of the American Library of Musicology (ALM). Seeger envisioned the short-lived ALM as a publisher of music-related resources, but it ceased to exist by 1936.

Later life

Roberts moved to Tryon, North Carolina, in part to care for her father, after a 1935 funding slash eliminated her position at Yale. In this small southern environment, she learned to grow her own food and became an accomplished horticulturist. During World War II, Roberts joined other Tryon women in cooking and canning foods to be sent to Europe. After her father's death, Roberts relocated to New Haven, Connecticut in 1945 where she spent the rest of her life. She became a member of the Horticultural Society of New York and sat on the Board of Directors of the New Haven Symphony Orchestra. While serving on that Board, Roberts co-wrote (with Doris Cousins) "A History of the New Haven Symphony Orchestra Celebrating its Seventh-Fifth Season".   She died on March 26, 1985, and the bulk of her records are at the repository of the Sterling Memorial Library at Yale. Roberts estate established the Helen Roberts Trust, which underwrites a free performance on the New Haven Green by the New Haven Symphony Orchestra each summer. In recent years, the Symphony has performed with William Boughton, Cirque Mechanics, Kurt Elling, Jimmy Green, Alasdair Neale, Dianne Reeves, Amir ElSaffar's Rivers of Sound, and Tiempo Libre in concerts celebrating Helen Robert's musical legacy in the New Haven community.

Sound recordings
Partial listing

Publications
Partial listing

Special Bibliography - Six page bibliography 1967 from Ethnomusicology, Vol. 11, No. 2, May, on JStor.

Misc

Charlotte J. Frisbie (1989), Helen Heffron Roberts (1888-1985): A Tribute, Ethnomusicology, Vol. 33, No. 1 (Winter, 1989), pp. 97–111

See also
Linstead Market

Notes

Footnotes

Citations

Further reading 

1888 births
1985 deaths
American women musicologists
Ethnomusicologists
Yale University staff
People from Chicago
Scientists from New Haven, Connecticut
American women archaeologists
People from Tryon, North Carolina
20th-century American musicologists
20th-century women writers
20th-century American women musicians
20th-century American archaeologists
Historians from Illinois
Historians from Connecticut